Acorns (German: Eichel, or more unusually Hackl or Ecker) is a suit in a deck of German playing cards or Swiss playing cards. This suit was invented in 15th-century German-speaking lands and is a survivor from a large pool of experimental suit signs created to replace the Latin suits. Around 1480, French card makers adapted this sign into clubs in a French deck (known as clovers in France).

In English, cards are referred to as in a French deck (e.g. the "10 of Acorns"), but in German as Eichel-Zehn.

Acorns are the highest suit in the games of Skat, Schafkopf and Doppelkopf, but the lowest in Préférence. In Watten, the 7 of Acorns (the Spitz or Soach) is the third highest trump card.

The gallery below shows a suit of Acorns from a German-suited deck of 32 cards. The pack is of the Saxonian pattern:

Individual cards 
The following cards have special powers or names in certain games:
 Ober of Acorns - permanent top trump in Schafkopf, where it is known as the Old Man (der Alte)
 Unter of Acorns - permanent trump in Schafkopf and top trump in Skat.
 Seven of Acorns - one of the top three trumps in games like Watten, where it is called the Spitz ("tip" or "point")

References 

Card suits